Electric Time Company, founded in 1928, is a manufacturer of tower and street clocks marketed worldwide.

History
Electric Time Company was founded in 1928 and incorporated in the state of Massachusetts in 1932. It was founded by a salesman for the Self Winding Clock Company and Telechron of Ashland, Massachusetts. Originally part of Telechron it progressed from an office in Boston, Massachusetts to manufacturing facilities in Wellesley, Massachusetts; South Natick, Massachusetts; and, currently, a  manufacturing facility in Medfield, Massachusetts.  

Electric Time produces approximately 1000 clocks annually and is the largest maker of custom outdoor clocks in the United States.  Electric Time produces tower clocks, post clocks, and bracket clocks.  Electric Time has many clock installations throughout the world, ranging from Brazil to Turkey to Europe.  Some notable installations are Wrigley Field, Tiffany & Co, Disneyworld, Disneyland and the Great American Ball Park.

Media
Electric Time has been featured on the documentary series How It's Made and the local Boston television news magazine Chronicle.  Electric Time was the basis for an article in The Wall Street Journal on Street Clocks.

References

External links

Youtube.com: How It's Made - Post Clocks

Clock manufacturing companies of the United States
Manufacturing companies based in Massachusetts
Manufacturing companies established in 1928
1928 establishments in Massachusetts
Horology